The Washington Wizards are an American professional basketball team based in Washington, D.C. They are a member of the Southeast Division of the Eastern Conference in the National Basketball Association (NBA). The team plays its home games at the Capital One Arena (formerly the MCI Center and the Verizon Center). The franchise was established in Chicago, Illinois as the Chicago Packers in 1961; after one season, its name was changed to the Chicago Zephyrs. In 1963, the franchise moved to Baltimore, Maryland and was renamed the Baltimore Bullets. It moved to Landover, Maryland in 1973 and changed its name to the Capital Bullets. After one season, the team became the Washington Bullets. In 1978, the Bullets won the 1978 NBA Finals in seven games for the franchise's only championship. In 1997, the team became the Washington Wizards, which is the team's current name. Since their formation, the Wizards have won six divisional championships, four conference championships, one league championship and have appeared in the playoffs twenty-three times.

There have been 24 head coaches for the Wizards franchise. The franchise's first coach was Jim Pollard, who led the team for one season. Dick Motta is the only Wizards coach to have led the team to a championship; the team won the 1978 NBA Finals as the Washington Bullets during his tenure. Gene Shue is the only Wizards coach to have won the NBA Coach of the Year Award; he won it twice, in 1969 and 1982. No Wizards coach has been elected into the Basketball Hall of Fame as a coach, but four have been elected into the Hall of Fame as a player: Jim Pollard, Buddy Jeannette, K. C. Jones and Wes Unseld. Shue is the franchise's all-time leader in regular-season games coached (1027) and wins (522); Jones is the franchise's all-time leader in regular-season winning percentage (.630). Dick Motta is the franchise's all-time leader in playoff games coached (51) and wins (27), as well as playoff-game winning percentage (.529). Five Wizards coaches have spent their entire NBA head coaching career with the team: Mike Farmer, Bob Staak, Jim Brovelli, Leonard Hamilton and Ed Tapscott. The team's current head coach is Wes Unseld Jr.

Key

Coaches

Notes
 A running total of the number of coaches of the franchise. Thus, any coach who has two or more separate terms as head coach is only counted once.
 Each year is linked to an article about that particular NBA season.

References
General

Specific

Lists of National Basketball Association head coaches by team

Head Coaches